The Ford Fairmont is a model line of compact cars that was manufactured by Ford from the 1978 to 1983 model years.  The successor of the Ford Maverick, the Fairmont marked the third generation of compact sedans sold by Ford in North America. Slotted between the Pinto and Granada within the Ford line (later the Escort and LTD), Lincoln-Mercury sold the line as the Mercury Zephyr. In contrast to its predecessor, which was only available as a two- or four-door sedan, the model line was offered as a two-door notchback sedan, two-door coupe, four-door sedan, and five-door station wagon.

The inaugural model lines of the rear-wheel drive Ford Fox platform (which served to replace models based on the Ford Falcon), the Fairmont and Zephyr shared underpinnings with twelve additional model lines for Ford, Mercury, and Lincoln. Though the model line was produced for only six model years, the Fox platform would live on for another two decades, underpinning vehicles (in updated form) through the 2004 model year.

Through its production, Ford produced the Fairmont at numerous facilities across North America. On November 15, 1977, the 100 millionth vehicle assembled by Ford Motor Company was a 1978 Ford Fairmont Futura coupe.  For the 1984 model year, Ford replaced the Fairmont with the front-wheel drive Ford Tempo.

Background and development
In April 1973, the American EPA released its comprehensive list of fuel economy results. In October of the same year, the 1973 oil crisis started. At the time, Ford's North American product line included the subcompact Pinto and Mustang II, and the compact Maverick, but replacements for all of these models would soon be needed. At the same time, Ford of England's Cortina line was in need of refreshing, as was the Taunus model built by Ford of Germany.

Changes were also happening at Ford's executive level, as William O. Bourke, ex-chairman of Ford of Europe and one-time managing director of Ford of Australia, was made executive vice president of North American Operations and Robert Alexander, previously with Ford of Europe as vice president in charge of car development, moved to same position in the States.

Hal Sperlich was vice-president of product planning and research at Ford. A proponent of downsizing, Sperlich conceived of a "world car" that could be sold in both Europe and North America as a solution to the needs of the various divisions.

Some sources suggest that the "Fox" name was borrowed from the Audi 80, sold in the US and Australia as the "Audi Fox" beginning in May 1973, because Ford's executives considered the 80 their class-leading subcompact competitor, and made it the baseline reference for the new platform. Another reports that Ford used the Fox name in an internal report as early as February 1973, making it less likely to have been borrowed from the German model. In December 1973, Ford President Lee Iacocca formally approved development of the Fox platform.

Although the Fairmont would be the first Fox-based car to reach the market, development was guided by an anticipated sport coupe to be based on the new platform.

Development started in early 1973 on both a short wheelbase version, to replace the Pinto/Cortina/Taunus lines, and a long-wheelbase version, that would become the Fairmont. By 1974, the difficulties faced in meeting the conflicting regulatory requirements in different markets and differing production methods used by the various divisions had killed the world car idea. In 1975, North American Automobile Operations took over development of the Fox platform from Sperlich's Product Planning and Research group.

The first running Fox/Fairmont prototype was a modified Cortina with a MacPherson strut and torsion bar front suspension.

A 1980 Fairmont station wagon converted to an electric vehicle by Electric Vehicles Associates Inc. and renamed the EVA Current Fare Wagon was evaluated by the US Department of Energy from March 1980 to November 1981.

Model overview
The Ford Fairmont was launched in August 1977 as a 1978 model.  The name was first used by Ford in 1965 for the Australian Fairmont, an upscale trim level model of the Ford Falcon (XP), and had also been used in the South African market in 1969.

Chassis specifications
The Fairmont is based on the rear-wheel drive Ford Fox platform, using steel unibody construction. The independent front suspension comprised lower lateral arms, MacPherson struts, and helical-wound coil springs. In what Ford called a modified or hybrid MacPherson strut system, the coil springs were mounted separately from the struts rather than concentrically, being located between the lower arm and front cross-member. A front anti-roll bar was standard equipment. The rear suspension used a solid axle suspended on coil springs and vertically mounted dampers. The axle was located by four links; two lower trailing arms and two sharply angled upper control arms.

The Fairmont has power-assisted brakes, with 10.0 inch vented front discs and 9.0 x 1.8 inch rear drums. Standard wheels and tires were 14x5.0 and DR78-14 respectively. Steering was by a rack and pinion system with 3.2 turns lock-to-lock.

Powertrain
For its entire production run, the standard engine for the Fairmont was a  inline-4 (shared with the Pinto). Initially producing 88 hp, following several revisions, output rose to 90 hp to 1983. The 2.3 L engine was initially paired with a 3-speed manual (replaced by a 4-speed in 1979), with a 3-speed automatic offered as an option. For 1980 only, a 120 hp turbocharged version of the 2.3 L engine (shared with the Mustang Cobra) was available in Fairmont sedans and coupes. Examples with the turbocharged engine were distinguished by a center-mounted hood "power bulge".

As an option, a  inline-6 (shared with the Maverick and Granada) was offered from 1978 to 1983 model years. While offering less horsepower than the 2.3 L inline-4, the 3.3 L inline-6 produced significantly more torque. For 1978, the standard transmission was a 3-speed manual (replaced by a 4-speed for 1979); a 3-speed automatic was offered as an option.

For 1978 to 1981 model years, the Fairmont was offered with two different Windsor V8 engines (shared with mid-size and full-size Ford vehicles). For 1978 and 1979, a 139 hp  V8 was offered, available with a 4-speed manual transmission for the 1979 model year only. It was replaced by a 115 hp  V8 for 1980 and 1981. The 255 engine was paired exclusively with a 3-speed automatic transmission.

Body design
The Fairmont debuted for 1978 with three body configurations; a two-door sedan, a four-door sedan, and a five-door station wagon. Late in the 1978 model year, a two-door coupe was introduced; named Futura, the name revived the sporty trim level used for the 1960s Ford Falcon.

The Fairmont Futura was developed from a Fairmont-based Thunderbird design proposal from March 1976. The Futura was a two-door coupe distinguished by a model-specific roofline that featured a wrapover B-pillar similar to the 1977–1979 Ford Thunderbird but without opera windows. The rear fascia was also given its own wrap-around taillamp design. To further differentiate the Futura from the standard Fairmont, the coupe was fitted with the 4-headlight fascia from the Zephyr, and a cross-hatched grille was used in place of the standard eggcrate grille. For the 1980 model year Ford expanded the Futura nameplate to include a four-door sedan and added a Futura station wagon for 1981.

For 1981, the exterior trim was revised with the addition of a slim molding strip along the side exterior panels; convenience equipment was also increased. For 1982, several model revisions were made. Ford moved the Fairmont station wagon to the Granada model line and the Futura trim became the sole trim, expanding it to the two-door sedan for the first time. Effectively, this standardized the four-headlight front fascia (of the Futura coupe and Mercury Zephyr).

For 1983, Ford introduced an "S" model of the Fairmont Futura as a base trim. Sold only as a sedan and only with the 2.3 L engine, the radio and right-hand mirror of the Futura S became options.

Discontinuation

During the early 1980s, Ford undertook a major revision of its product ranges.  Following the 1981 introduction of the Ford Escort, the automaker sought to expand its use of front-wheel drive across the compact and mid-size segment; the rear-wheel drive Fox platform remained in production, used mainly for performance and luxury vehicles (the Mustang, Thunderbird, their Lincoln-Mercury counterparts, but also the Ford LTD/Mercury Marquis).

Released for the 1984 model year, the Ford Tempo and Mercury Topaz replaced the Fairmont/Zephyr. An extended-wheelbase sedan counterpart of the Escort/Lynx, the front-wheel drive Tempo and Topaz followed the Thunderbird in using aerodynamic-influenced exterior styling.  As the Fairmont was ending its model cycle in 1983, it would become the sole Ford model in North America to retain "FORD" lettering in place of the Ford Blue Oval emblem; the Thunderbird (which used its own emblem) never used Ford badging on the grille.

The same one-piece lift-up tailgate designed for the Fairmont wagon was also used on the fourth generation Australian XD, XE and XF series Ford Falcon and Fairmont wagons, which were produced until 1988.

Production Figures:

*Futura sedans and Futura wagons are included in the Sedan and Wagon figures

Mercury Zephyr

From the 1978 to 1983 model years, the Mercury Zephyr served as the Mercury counterpart of the Ford Fairmont, replacing the Maverick-based Comet.  The third vehicle to use the nameplate within Ford Motor Company, the Mercury Zephyr shares its nameplate with the 1936–1940 Lincoln-Zephyr and the 1950–1972 Ford Zephyr (produced by Ford of Britain). Within the Mercury line, the Zephyr was slotted between the Bobcat (replaced for 1981 by the Lynx) and the Monarch (replaced for 1981 by the Cougar).

Sharing the same model range as the Fairmont, the Zephyr was offered as two-door and four-door sedans, a five-door station wagon, and a two-door Zephyr Z-7 coupe.  At its launch, the Zephyr was externally distinguished by the use of four headlights (initially only used by the Fairmont Futura).  The exterior was styled with design elements that were adopted by multiple Mercury product lines during the early 1980s (the Lynx, Capri, Cougar, and Marquis), including a waterfall-style grille, horizontally-ribbed taillamps, and (non-functional) front fender vents.

The Zephyr was initially offered in standard, ES (a successor to the ESS trim of the Monarch), and Ghia trims, for 1981, both were replaced by GS trim (the equivalent of Futura on non-coupe Fairmonts).  In line with other Mercury station wagons, the model line was offered with a Villager option package, including exterior (simulated) woodgrain trim.

At the beginning of the 1980s, the Zephyr was gradually phased out of the Mercury model line.  For 1982, both the 4.2L V8 option and the station wagon were moved to the Cougar model line.  As Mercury transitioned its model line to front-wheel drive, the Zephyr was replaced by the Mercury Topaz for the 1984 model year.

Following its use by Mercury, the Zephyr nameplate was used by Lincoln a second time.  The 2006 Lincoln Zephyr mid-size sedan was renamed the Lincoln MKZ for 2007, commencing the Lincoln "MK" model nomenclature.

Variants

Ford Durango

The Ford Durango was produced by a joint venture between Ford and National Coach Corporation in 1981. Based heavily on the Fairmont Futura coupe, the Durango was a two-door, two-seat car-based pickup truck that was intended as a possible replacement for the 1977–1979 Ford Ranchero as well as a competitor to the downsized Chevrolet El Camino/GMC Caballero. Approximately 200 are estimated to have been produced.

European Sport Option
The European Sport Option was an appearance and suspension package offered in 1978 through 1980. It is abbreviated "ES Option" or "ESO". Exterior changes included a black grille, black cowl grille, deluxe bumpers, black window frames, black exterior mirrors, black C-pillar ventilation louvers, bright belt moldings and turbine wheel covers. The interior featured black carpeting, a black three-spoke leather-wrapped steering wheel, black instrument panel with gray engine-turned trim and black or chamois-colored seats. The running gear was modified with stiffer springs, re-valved shocks, and a rear anti-roll bar. The ESO mounted DR78-14 radial tires on 5.5 inch wheels, one half inch wider than stock.

Police and Taxicab packages
In 1978 Ford also made available specially prepared Fairmonts suitable for use as police cars and taxicabs. Initially the only engines offered for these applications were the 200 cubic inch inline six or the 302 V8. Ford's product literature lists the following special features for both packages:

 Automatic transmission with first-gear lockout
 Externally-mounted transmission oil cooler
 Power brakes
 Heavy-duty body construction with extra reinforcements
 Heavy-duty suspension package (Police or Taxi), including higher-rate springs, hardened spindles, special shocks and struts
 Cooling package with high fin-density radiator
 Heavy-duty 14 x 5.5 inch wheels

In later years the naturally-aspirated 2.3 L inline four engine became available as well.

A few turbo four-door automatic sedans were used for testing by the California Highway Patrol.

Other markets

Mexico
The Ford Fairmont was introduced in Mexico in late 1977 as a 1978 model, replacing the Ford Maverick that was produced there locally. The Mexican Fairmont was available exclusively with the 5.0 L engine (302) with manual and three-speed automatic transmissions. It was offered as a two- or four-door sedan and a wagon. The Futura coupe with its distinctive Thunderbird-style roofline was never offered in Mexico. Instead there was an uplevel two-door sedan called the Fairmont Elite. It was distinguished from other Fairmonts by its higher level of equipment and vinyl roof. It used the four headlight grille from the Fairmont Futura along with the Mercury Zephyr's taillamps and rear quarter window louvers.

For 1981, all versions of the Fairmont got four headlights. The regular Fairmont continued to use the Futura grille while the Fairmont Elite used the Mercury Zephyr grille.

For 1982 the Fairmont Elite was renamed the Ford Elite II, and was offered in both two- and four-door sedans. The Elite II used the entire front end and matching rear bumper from the 1982 North American Ford Granada. The base Fairmont adapted the Mercury Zephyr grille used on the previous Elite.

For 1983, the Fairmont received a new 3.8 L Essex V6 engine which was sold in addition to the existing V8. This was the last year of the Fairmont as it was replaced later by the Ford Topaz which was a hybrid assembly of the Mercury Topaz with a Ford Tempo front end.

Venezuela
A version of the Fairmont was manufactured in Venezuela where it was sold as the Ford Zephyr. The Ford Futura was also sold as an individual model without Fairmont badging.

Reception
Contemporary reviews were generally favorable, with many commenting on the "European" feel of the car and comparing it to the Volvo 200 series.

The 1978 Fairmont has been called the "most efficient Ford family (sedan) ever built from a space-per-weight perspective."

Motorsports
In 1978 Bob Glidden campaigned an NHRA Pro Stock Futura powered by a Cleveland V8. The car won its debut race on 8 July 1978 at the Edgewater Winston Championship Series, where it also set a national record. Additional wins followed at the NHRA Grandnational, U.S. Nationals, Fall Nationals, World Finals and Beech Bend WCS. Glidden won his third national championship title with the car. The Futura was retired at the end of the 1978 season.

See also
Ford Fox platform

References

External links

 Ford (USA) Fairmont specifications: versions & types
 Ford Fairmont: la transición del sedán clásico 

Fairmont
Rear-wheel-drive vehicles
Compact cars
Coupés
Sedans
Station wagons
1980s cars
Motor vehicles manufactured in the United States
Cars introduced in 1978